Kivi is an Estonian and Finnish surname meaning "stone" in both languages. Notable people with the surname include:

Aleksis Kivi (1834–1872), Finnish author
Antero Kivi (1904–1981), Finnish discus thrower
Eve Kivi (born 1938), Estonian actress
Iikka Kivi (born 1986), Finnish stand-up comedian and scriptwriter
Juha Kivi (born 1964), Finnish long jumper
Katrin Kivi (born 1967), Estonian diplomat
Karri Kivi (born 1970), Finnish ice hockey player and coach
Maarja Kivi (born 1986), Estonian musician, also known as Marya Roxx
Signe Kivi (born 1957), Estonian textile artist and politician

As a first name 
Kivi Larmola (born 1966), Finnish comics artist

Estonian-language surnames
Finnish-language surnames